is a Japanese former football player and manager. He is currently the manager of the club Suzuka Point Getters. He played for the Japan national team. His brother Kazuyoshi Miura is also a footballer.

Club career
Miura was born in Shizuoka on 15 July 1965. After graduating from Shizuoka Gakuen High School, through Brazilian club Santos, he joined Yomiuri (later Verdy Kawasaki) in 1986. The club won the champions in Japan Soccer League 3 times, JSL Cup 1 times and Emperor's Cup 2 times. In Asia, the club also won 1987 Asian Club Championship. In 1992, moved to new club Shimizu S-Pulse based in his local Shizuoka in 1992. In 1996, he returned to Verdy Kawasaki. The club won 1996 Emperor's Cup. However his opportunity for play has decreased, he moved to Avispa Fukuoka in 1999. He played as regular player at the club. However the club was relegated to J2 League in 2001 and he moved to Vissel Kobe in 2002. He retired in 2003. He was 38 years old.

National team career
In October 1993, Miura was selected Japan national team. On 4 October 1993, he debuted for Japan national team against Ivory Coast. He played as left side-back on behalf of regular player Satoshi Tsunami could not play for injury. Miura also played at 1994 World Cup qualification. He played 3 games for Japan in 1993.

Coaching career
After retirement, Miura became a manager for J2 League club Giravanz Kitakyushu in 2011. Although Giravanz was at the bottom place in 2010 season, Miura led Giravanz to 8th place in 2011 season. In 2012 season, Giravanz finished at 9th place. In 2013, he moved to J2 club Tokyo Verdy which Miura played long time. However the club results were bad and Miura was sacked in September 2014 when the club was at the 20th place of 22 clubs. In 2015, Miura moved to Thailand and signed with Chiangmai. However he was sacked for poor performance in July. In 2016, he signed with J3 League club Kataller Toyama. He moved to J3 club Kagoshima United FC in 2017. In 2018, he led the club to the 2nd place and the club was promoted to J2 first time in the club history. However he resigned end of 2018 season. On 15 July 2021, he was appointed as manager at Suzuka Point Getters.

Club statistics

National team statistics

Managerial statistics

References

External links
 
 Japan National Football Team Database
 
 

1965 births
Living people
Association football people from Shizuoka Prefecture
Japanese footballers
Japan international footballers
Japanese football managers
Japan Soccer League players
J1 League players
Tokyo Verdy players
Shimizu S-Pulse players
Avispa Fukuoka players
Vissel Kobe players
J2 League managers
J3 League managers
Giravanz Kitakyushu managers
Tokyo Verdy managers
Kataller Toyama managers
Kagoshima United FC managers
Suzuka Point Getters managers
Association football defenders
Association football midfielders